The Women's uneven bars gymnastics at the 2017 Summer Universiade in Taipei was held on 23 August at the Taipei Nangang Exhibition Center.

Schedule
All times are Taiwan Standard Time (UTC+08:00)

Results

References

Women's uneven bars